"This Could Be Us" is a song by American hip hop duo Rae Sremmurd. It was released on April 21, 2015 by EarDrummers and Interscope Records, as the fourth single from their debut album SremmLife. The song was produced by EarDrummers-founder, Mike Will Made It. The song has peaked at number 49 on the US Billboard Hot 100. The music video for the song was released on May 12, 2015.

Music video

The music video was released on May 12, 2015. It depicts Swae Lee and Slim Jimmy video-chatting with their girlfriends while in Johannesburg, South Africa. The girls, both left in America, are irritated for not being informed and end up dumping them. In response, both tell their respective girlfriends "Why You Playin". Jasmine V and Dej Loaf make cameos as the boys' girlfriends. The video features landmarks such as the bronze Statue of Nelson Mandela, Nelson Mandela Bridge, Lion Park and the road out of Sandton.

Credits and personnel
Credits adapted from SremmLife booklet.

Writing – Aaquil Brown, Khalif Brown, Michael Williams II, Marquel Middlebrooks
Production – Mike Will Made It
Co-production – Marz
Additional vocals – Jace
Recording – Stephen Hybicki and Randy Lanphear at Tree Sound Studios in Atlanta, Georgia
Audio mixing – Jaycen Joshua and Mike Will Made It at Larrabee Sound Studios in North Hollywood, California
Assistant mix engineering – Maddox Chhim and Ryand Kaul
Mastering – Dave Kutch, The Mastering Palace, New York City

Charts

Certifications

References

External links 
 

2014 songs
2015 singles
Rae Sremmurd songs
Songs written by Swae Lee
Interscope Records singles
Song recordings produced by Mike Will Made It
Songs written by Mike Will Made It
Songs written by Marquel Middlebrooks
Songs written by Slim Jxmmi